The Arts Council of New Zealand Toi Aotearoa (Creative New Zealand) is the national arts development agency of the New Zealand government, investing in artists and arts organisations, offering capability building programmes and developing markets and audiences for New Zealand arts domestically and internationally. Its funding consists of approximately 30% central government funding and the remaining amount from the Lotteries Commission. In 2014/15, the Arts Council invested a record $43.6 million in New Zealand arts and arts organisations.

Funding is available for artists, community groups and arts organisations. Creative New Zealand funds projects and organisations across many art-forms, including theatre, dance, music, literature, visual art, craft object art, Māori arts, Pacific arts, Inter-arts and Multi-disciplinary.

Funding 
Creative New Zealand funding is distributed under four broad funding programmes:
 Investment programmes
 Grants and special opportunities
 Creative Communities Scheme
 International programme
In 2012, Creative New Zealand introduced Arts Development/Leadership Investments to replace its Recurrently Funded Organisations funding. Arts Development Investments provide funding for extended periods for established artists, arts practitioners, groups and arts organisations.

Governance structure 
The Arts Council of New Zealand Toi Aotearoa (previously the Queen Elizabeth II Arts Council)  is the governing board of Creative New Zealand. The Council consisted of 13 members in 2014/15.

Legislative framework 
Creative New Zealand works within a legislative framework formed by the Arts Council of New Zealand Toi Aotearoa Act 2014 and the Crown Entities Act 2004.

See also
 Arts Pasifika Awards
Te Waka Toi Awards
Prime Minister's Awards for literary achievement
Matafetu Smith

References

External links
Creative New Zealand

Cultural organisations based in New Zealand
Arts councils
New Zealand autonomous Crown entities